, better known by his stage name of , is a Japanese narrator and impressionist from Hachinohe, Aomori. He is currently attached to Office Osawa; he was previously attached to the Tokyo Actor's Consumer's Cooperative Society, Jinsei Pro, and Across Entertainment. His impression repertoire includes the likes of Naoto Takenaka, Masayuki Suzuki, Hiroshi Kamayatsu, Yūzō Kayama and Akira Fuse.

Roles

Narration
Kagaijugyō: Ryōko Moriyama Edition
Thrill Nayoru
Kikai Sentai Zenkaiger

Television animation
Hajime no Ippo: New Challenger (Episode #26)

Video games
Suikoden V (Orok, Chuck, Tsuvaik, Boss Wild)

Other
  (George Tokoro impression)

External links
Across Entertainment
K Production

1964 births
Living people
People from Hachinohe
Male voice actors from Aomori Prefecture
Japanese impressionists (entertainers)
Japanese male voice actors
Across Entertainment voice actors
Tokyo Actor's Consumer's Cooperative Society voice actors
20th-century Japanese male actors
21st-century Japanese male actors